Cam Fraser (1932 – May 16, 1999) was a professional Canadian football punter who played for the Hamilton Tiger-Cats of the Canadian Football League from 1951 to 1961. He came out of retirement in 1969 after an injury to Joe Zuger.

Fraser appeared in the 1957 Grey Cup, a 32–7 victory for Hamilton against the Winnipeg Blue Bombers.

References

External links
 Cam Fraser at ProFootballArchives

1999 deaths
Hamilton Tiger-Cats players
Montreal Alouettes players
Canadian football punters
Players of Canadian football from Ontario
Ottawa Gee-Gees football players
Year of birth uncertain
Sportspeople from Hamilton, Ontario
1932 births